The Old Dominion–William & Mary rivalry (formerly known as the Battle for the Silver Mace in football) refers to the U.S. college rivalry games between the Old Dominion Monarchs of the Sun Belt Conference and the William & Mary Tribe of the Colonial Athletic Association. They are the two largest and most historically tenured NCAA Division I rivals in Hampton Roads, Virginia.

History 
Old Dominion University was founded as the Norfolk branch of the College of William & Mary in 1930. The Norfolk Division of William & Mary sports program initiated from football and basketball competitions against local high school teams. In 1941, their football program dissolved because of a $10,000 debt, poor attendance, and a ruling that did not allow freshman players on a branch campus. The Norfolk Division joined the Mason–Dixon Conference in September 1961, becoming its 16th member and competing with other William & Mary divisions as well as smaller NCAA Division II colleges in Virginia.  

Old Dominion became independent of William & Mary in 1962 after Governor Albertis Harrison signed legislation dissolving William & Mary's College System. Seven years later, they gained University status and competed as a Division II independent. William & Mary competed in the Southern Conference. Since ODU's declaration, the two schools began competing, despite belonging to separate conferences.

The rivalry intensified from 1991–2013 when both schools competed in the Colonial Athletic Association. Through this period, they competed against each other in 6 conference basketball tournaments and 6 baseball tournaments. They have competed in 26 joint men's soccer classics. Since, Old Dominion has gained the edge over William & Mary in most of their male varsity sports.

All-time series results

Basketball

Men's basketball 
Old Dominion and William & Mary men's basketball have competed in six total CAA conference tournaments. Old Dominion won 8 conference championships from 1991–2011. Despite the Monarchs' dominance during their CAA tenure, the William and Mary Tribe regathered a series of wins after ODU moved to Conference USA in 2013.

Football 

After ODU re-established its football program in 2009, Old Dominion and William & Mary competed as separate schools for the first time on September 18, 2010. The annual CAA divisional battles were coined the ‘Battle for the Silver Mace' with the winner to be presented with a replica of the Norfolk Mace on display at the Chrysler Museum of Art. Old Dominion competed for three matches with the Tribe before leaving the CAA to join Conference USA (FBS) in 2014 as an FCS independent.  ODU's move to the FBS inevitability cancelled their future matchups with the Tribe. 

Old Dominion announced that the two teams will meet on September 1, 2029. 

Old Dominion currently plays at S.B. Ballard Stadium; William & Mary at Zable Stadium.

References

External links 
 Old Dominion Monarchs
 William & Mary Tribe

College baseball rivalries in the United States
College basketball rivalries in the United States
College football rivalries in the United States
College soccer rivalries in the United States
College sports rivalries in the United States
College sports in Virginia
Old Dominion Monarchs
William & Mary Tribe
Sports rivalries in Virginia